Lakra/Lakda is an Indian family name.

Notable people with the surname include:

Anthresh Lalit Lakra (born 1983), Indian boxer
Bimal Lakra (born 1980), Indian field hockey player - Jharkhand
Birendra Lakra (born 1990), Indian field hockey player
Sawna Lakra (born 1941), Indian politician 
Shanti Teresa Lakra (born 1972), Indian medical nurse 
Sunita Lakra (born 1991), Indian field hockey player -

See also
Dr Lakra, Jeronimo Lopez Ramirez (born 1972),  Mexican artist

References

Indian surnames